Nerita chamaeleon is a species of sea snail, a marine gastropod mollusk in the family Neritidae.

Description
Their shell is smaller in size. It grows up to 25mm. They are colourful in nature and commonly seen in inter tidal rocky shore. They are active in night times.

Distribution
This snail is found on rocks, breakwaters and seawall of Pulau Ubin, Changi, Tanah Merah, Marina South, Labrador, Sentosa, Pulau Bukom, St. John's Island, Pulau Hantu, Pulau Semakau, Pulau Salu, Tuas and Godavari region in India.
Present too in southern Thailand(Andamane sea)

References

Neritidae
Gastropods described in 1758
Taxa named by Carl Linnaeus